Michael Stangel (born 14 August 1967) is an Australian record producer, singer, songwriter, and a finalist in the second series of The Voice Australia in 2013.

In 2017 Michael began his own management company and has represented Nathaniel Willemse, Taylor Henderson, Justice Crew, and Merril Bainbridge.

Discography

Charting singles

References

External links
 Michaelstrangel.com.au

The Voice (Australian TV series) contestants
Living people
Australian pop singers
1967 births
21st-century Australian male singers
Musicians from Geelong